Multiple ships of the United States Navy have borne the name Oakland, in honor of the city of Oakland, California.

 , built in 1918, was a steamship originally built for British owners. She was pressed into USN service for service during World War I. She was decommissioned after short service.
 , was an  commissioned in 1943 and served during World War II and decommissioned in 1949
Commissioned on 17 April 2021, in Oakland, California.

References

United States Navy ship names